Savenaca Taga is a Fijian former professional rugby league footballer who represented Fiji at the 1995 World Cup.

Playing career
Taga was selected for Fiji for the 1995 World Cup and played in all three matches. In 1996 he played for Fiji against Australia during the Super League war.

References

Living people
Fijian rugby league players
Fiji national rugby league team players
Rugby league halfbacks
Year of birth missing (living people)